Zsivoczky is a Hungarian surname. Notable people with the surname include:

 Attila Zsivoczky (born 1977), Hungarian athlete
 Norbert Zsivóczky (born 1988), Hungarian footballer

See also
 Györgyi Zsivoczky-Farkas (born 1985), Hungarian athlete

Hungarian-language surnames